Said Amzazi (born April 11, 1965) is a Moroccan politician. Since January 22, 2018, he has been the Minister of National Education, Vocational Training, Higher Education and Scientific Research in the government of Saadeddine Othmani.

Biography 
After serving as the dean of the Faculty of Sciences in Rabat between 2011 and 2015, Amzazi became the president of Mohammed V University in 2015.

On January 22, 2018, he was appointed by King Mohammed VI as Minister of National Education, Vocational Training, Higher Education and Scientific Research. On April 7, 2020, he was also appointed as the government spokesperson.

References 

1965 births
Government ministers of Morocco
Living people
Moroccan politicians